Achilles Point (Te Pane o Horoiwi – The head of Horoiwi) is a rocky point on the headland at the eastern end of the small sandy beach named Ladies Bay, Auckland, New Zealand. The name 'Te Pane o Horoiwi' can also sometimes refer to the whole headland between St Heliers and Tamaki River estuary. Achilles Point is named after a ship called HMNZS Achilles (70) which defeated the German pocket battleship Admiral Graf Spee in 1939. The headland, from the point round to the Tamaki heads, was previously known as Te Pane o Horoiwi, named after Horoiwi who arrived in New Zealand on the Tainui canoe (waka). 

Ladies Bay is a secluded beach, below steep cliffs, on the headland west of the lookout over Achilles point. Both Ladies Bay and further to the east, the more secluded Gentleman's Bay beach are unofficially places where nudists can often be found enjoying the sun and sand however the fine for indecent exposure is $200. The secluded bays are also popular with the male gay community.

Glover Park is an ancient volcanic crater which erupted about 160,000 years ago. The volcanic tuff ring crater is also known in Māori language as Whakahumu or geologically as the 'St Heliers explosion crater'. It is found in the center of the headland between West Tamaki Head and the eastern end of St Heliers Bay beach. It was filled in during the 1950s to form a public sports field. Before that it formed a seasonal shallow lake or swamp.  

The seaward side of the tuff crater is falling away down the coastal cliffs to 'Gentleman's Bay' far below. The tuff ring is made from ash and ejected material. The cliffs were there before the volcano erupted so the volcanic rock draped over the clay hill that once existed before sea levels rose and began eroding it away to become the steep cliffs we see today. Some volcanic rocks can be found on the beach below – some fragments ejected from deep in the earth, or blocks of tuff ring that were once perched on top of the cliff.  Rangitoto Island is directly to the north, however Rangitoto is a recent eruption (1,000 years ago) and was not always there to shelter the cliffs from powerful wave action. 
There is an old concrete water tower built on the tuff ring formed around the edge of the crater opposite the seaward side.

Geology

Going east, past Ladies Bay and Gentleman's Bay, we round the West Tamaki Head into the Tamaki Estuary. It is here we find an excellent example of the grey coloured 'Parnell Grit' accessible from Karaka Bay. 'Parnell Grit', is a brittle sedimentary rock containing fragments of scoria, andesite, and pumice.

At low tide there is an interesting walk from Ladies Bay along the base of the cliffs to St Helier's Bay. The rocky shoreline overlooks the Waitemata Harbour which itself occupies a drowned valley system cut in marine sediments of Miocene Age (15–25 million years ago). Generally, around Auckland these soft Miocene sediments are alternating Waitemata series sandstone and mudstone with more massive beds of sandstone sometimes with minor occurrences of limestone. 
The concretions that can be easily seen, are formed by the action of ground water with dissolved minerals (mainly calcium carbonate of which limestone is made) percolating through the layers. Calcium carbonate is an important component of concrete and fills in the pore spaces between grains of sediment thereby cementing the grains together and making them more durable against erosion.

References 

Volcanoes of Auckland: A Field Guide. Hayward, B.W.; Auckland University Press, 2019, 335 pp. .

External links
 Archaeology and History of St Heliers, Auckland.
 Geology of the headland
 Point to point walkway ARC – St Heliers to Churchill park through the crater at Glover Park
 Explanation of concretions
 Point to Point walkway. The full point to point walk is approximately 7.5km long, starting at the popular St Heliers Bay and finishing at Point England. Allow three to four hours.

Gallery
Geological features between Ladies Bay and St Heliers Bay

Geography of Auckland
Headlands of the Auckland Region
Hauraki Gulf
Ōrākei Local Board Area